Escape is an American radio drama. It was radio's leading anthology series of high-adventure radio dramas, airing on CBS from July 7, 1947 to September 25, 1954.

Overview 
Since the program did not have a regular sponsor like Suspense (a sister program that often used the same actors and scripts), it was subjected to frequent schedule shifts and lower production budgets, although Richfield Oil signed on as a sponsor for five months in 1950.

Despite these problems, Escape enthralled many listeners during its seven-year run. The series' well-remembered opening combined Mussorgsky's Night on Bald Mountain with this introduction, as intoned by William Conrad and later Paul Frees:
"Tired of the everyday grind? Ever dream of a life of romantic adventure? Want to get away from it all? We offer you... Escape!"

Following the opening theme, a second announcer (usually Roy Rowan) would add:
"Escape! Designed to free you from the four walls of today for a half-hour of high adventure!"

Adaptations
Of the more than 230 Escape episodes, most have survived in good condition. Many story premises, both originals and adaptations, involved a protagonist in dire life-or-death straits, and the series featured more science fiction and supernatural tales than Suspense. Some of the memorable adaptations include Daphne du Maurier's "The Birds", Carl Stephenson's "Leiningen Versus the Ants", Algernon Blackwood's "Confession", Ray Bradbury's oft-reprinted "Mars Is Heaven", George R. Stewart's Earth Abides (the program's only two-parter), Richard Connell's "The Most Dangerous Game" and F. Scott Fitzgerald's "The Diamond as Big as the Ritz".

John Collier's "Evening Primrose", about people who live inside a department store, was later adapted to TV as a Stephen Sondheim musical starring Anthony Perkins. William Conrad, Harry Bartell and Elliott Reid were heard in the chilling "Three Skeleton Key" (broadcast on 15 November 1949), the tale of three men trapped in an isolated lighthouse by thousands of rats; the half-hour was adapted from an Esquire short story by the French writer George Toudouze and later remade for the March 17, 1950 broadcast starring Vincent Price, Harry Bartell and Jeff Corey and again for the August 9, 1953 broadcast starring Paul Frees, Ben Wright and Jay Novello.

Actors on the series included Elvia Allman, Eleanor Audley, Parley Baer, Michael Ann Barrett, Tony Barrett, Harry Bartell, Ted Bliss, Lillian Buyeff, Ken Christy, William Conrad, Ted de Corsia, John Dehner, Don Diamond, Paul Dubov, Sam Edwards, Virginia Gregg, Lou Merrill, Howard McNear, Jess Kirkpatrick, Dee J. Thompson, Shep Menken, Frank Gerstle, George Neise, Jeanette Nolan, Dan O'Herlihy, Barney Phillips, Forrest Lewis, Robert Griffin, Alan Reed, Bill Johnstone, Sandra Gould, Junius Matthews, Carleton G. Young, Marvin Miller, Frank Lovejoy, Berry Kroeger, Vic Perrin, Elliott Lewis, Eleanore Tanin, Herb Vigran, Jack Webb, Peggy Webber, and Will Wright.

Music was supplied by Del Castillo, organist Ivan Ditmars, Cy Feuer, Wilbur Hatch and Leith Stevens. The announcers were Paul Frees and Roy Rowan.

A television counterpart aired on CBS TV for a few months during 1950.

The program's opening announcement—"Tired of the everyday grind?"—was employed as a slogan for the counterculture magazine, New Escapologist.

List of episodes

See also
Audio theatre
Old-time radio

Listen to
Escape and Suspense
OTR Network Library: Escape (203 episodes)
Theater of the Ears: Escape
Internet Archive: Escape

References

Terry Salomonson's Audio Classics Archive Broadcast Log: Escape
Jerry Haendiges Vintage Radio Logs: Escape

External links

The Definitive: Escape! article and log (archived)
OTR Plot Spot: Escape – plot summaries and reviews.

1940s American radio programs
1950s American radio programs
Anthology radio series
Fantasy radio programs
Horror fiction radio programmes
American science fiction radio programs
American radio dramas
1947 radio programme debuts
1954 radio programme endings
CBS Radio programs
Radio programs adapted into television shows